Haat  or hat, even haat bazaar, is an open-air market that serves as a trading venue for local people in rural areas and towns of Indian subcontinent, especially in India, Nepal, Bangladesh and Bhutan. Haat bazaars are conducted on a regular basis, i.e. or that is once, twice, or three times a week and in some places every two weeks. At times, haat bazaars are organized in a different manner, to support or promote trading by and with rural people. In addition to providing trading opportunities, haat bazaars serve as meeting places, rural settlements come up around the haats which gradually grow into towns.

Bilateral Haats at international borders

Border Haats of India with neighbouring nations includejointly-run bi-lateral  Haats at designated places on India's border with neighbours such as on India–Bangladesh border, India-Bhutan border, India–Myanmar border, and India–Myanmar border.

List of popular Haats by country

India

In India, street vendors legitimately operate under the Street Vendors Act, 2014. Please help expand this partial and alphabetical list.
 
 Assam  
 Gohpur Haat Bazaar at Gohpur in Assam is considered India's largest.

 Delhi 
 Dilli Haat in Delhi is a famous permanent market place built in traditional style which is open every day. 

 Haryana, 
 Gita Mahotsav at Brahma Sarovar in Kurukshetra in Haryana, month long month Haat in Nov-Dec every year.
 Surajkund Haat at Surajkund in Faridabad in Haryana, month long Haat in Nov-Dec every year.

 Odisha
 Ekamra Haat is a permanent marketplace and a landmark famous for its art and crafts market in the capital city of Bhubaneswar.

 West Bengal
 Rampurhat is a municipal town in India that grew around a Haat.

Bangladesh

Two districts Lalmonirhat and Jaipurhat of Bangladesh have the suffix "haat" in their name, undoubtedly reflecting the presence of haat bazaars in those locations around which these cities grew up.

Nepal 
Eastern Nepal, most of the towns are named after the weekly haat. Aaitabare, Sombare, Mangalbare, Budhabare, Bihibare, Sukrabare and Sanischare are some common Nepali town names that are named for the day of the weekly haat.

Panchami, Nawamidanda, and Saptami are towns named after the fortnightly haats, according to the Hindu lunar calendar.

See also

 Indian subcontinent
 Bazaar
 Chaupal (public space)
 Dhaba
 International Border Haats
 Melā
 Tapri

 Other related 
Market (place)
Palengke in Philippines
Retail  
Wet market in Singapore

References

Bazaars
Bazaars in India
Food markets
Bengali words and phrases
Retail markets
Trading posts in India
Indian culture